Joseph-François-Édouard de Corsembleu Sieur de Desmahis (1 March 1723, Sully-sur-Loire – 25 February 1761, Paris) was an 18th-century French playwright.

Desmahis was initially known under the auspices of Voltaire by fugitive plays, including::

 Le Voyage de Saint-Germain ;
 L’Heureux amant qui sait te plaire.
1750: L’Impertinent, ou le Billet perdu two-act comedy.

He contributed the articles FAT and  FEMME to the Encyclopédie by Diderot and D’Alembert.

His Œuvres were collected in 2 vol. in-12 (1778).

Bibliography 
 Anatole Basseville, Un poète orléanais. De Corsembleu Desmahis, Orléans, 1906.
 Hervé Finous, Desmahis et les Corsembleut : le poète et les robins , Hervé Finous, Desmahis et les Corsembleut : le poète et les robins, in "Bulletin de la Société archéologique et historique de l'Orléanais", nouvelle série, tome XVIII, n°149, July 2006, (p. 38).
 Roger de Laurière, Desmahis de Corsembleu, poète et auteur dramatique orléanais, in "Bulletin de la Société archéologique et historique de l'Orléanais", nouvelle série, tome III, n°24, 4th trimester 1964, (p. 216-217).

References

External links 
 Joseph-François-Édouard de Corsembleu on Data.bnf.fr
 His plays and their presentations on CÉSAR
 Joseph-François-Edouard de Corsembleu de Desmahis at Consortium of European Research Libraries
 ARTFL Encyclopédie Project - Robert Morrissey, General Editor; Glenn Roe, Assoc. Editor

18th-century French writers
18th-century French male writers
18th-century French dramatists and playwrights
Contributors to the Encyclopédie (1751–1772)
1723 births
1761 deaths